Juan Antonio Pizzi Torroja (born 7 June 1968) is a retired professional footballer who played as a striker, currently manager of UAE Pro League club Al-Wasl.

He spent the bulk of his club career in Spain, mainly at Tenerife, helping to the side's consolidation in La Liga and amassing top division totals of 221 matches and 92 goals over eight seasons – he also played for Valencia and Barcelona.

Born in Argentina, Pizzi represented the Spain national team for four years, appearing with it in one World Cup and one European Championship. He embarked on a managerial career after retiring, winning the Copa América Centenario for Chile in 2016.

Club career
Born in Santa Fe, Pizzi started his professional career with Rosario Central, before transferring to Mexico's Deportivo Toluca FC. After only one year he moved to CD Tenerife, experiencing great individual success (a total of 30 goals in his first two seasons) while also helping the Canary Islands club to qualify for the UEFA Cup in his second year.

This performances prompted interest from fellow La Liga side Valencia CF, and Pizzi's subsequent purchase. However, highly unsettled, he returned at the end of the campaign to his previous team and in the second season in his second spell he fired them into another UEFA Cup qualification, topping the goal charts at 31 in 41 games and adding a further five in the Copa del Rey.

After that, Pizzi transferred to FC Barcelona. Never an undisputed starter, barred by Ronaldo, Sonny Anderson and the versatile Luis Enrique during his two-season stint, he managed to net 18 times in competitive matches, being very popular among the Camp Nou faithful.

With Barcelona, Pizzi won the Supercopa de España in 1996, the UEFA Super Cup and Spanish Cup in 1997, conquering the latter again the following year while also winning his only league title. Arguably, his most memorable moment was the decisive goal in the 5–4 home win over Atlético Madrid in the domestic cup's quarter-finals second leg, after the Blaugrana trailed 3–0 at half-time.

Subsequently, Pizzi returned to Argentina to play for Club Atlético River Plate, then had an unassuming spell in Portugal for FC Porto. After starting 2001–02 back with Rosario he signed with Villarreal CF for its closure, as the club had lost to a severe leg injury countryman Martín Palermo.

International career
Pizzi earned 22 caps for Spain and scored eight goals, his debut coming on 30 November 1994 in a 2–0 friendly win with Finland. The following 20 September, he helped to beat his country of birth Argentina 2–1, in an exhibition game played in Madrid.

Pizzi was part of the squads for UEFA Euro 1996 and the 1998 FIFA World Cup. In the latter, after being replaced by Fernando Morientes in a 0–0 draw against Paraguay as Spain exited in the group stage, he retired from the international scene.

Coaching career
After his retirement, aged almost 34, Pizzi played polo in the Barcelona region, then started his coaching career. Together with José del Solar he managed Argentine Primera División's Club Atlético Colón at the beginning of the Clausura 2005, but both were sacked after three losses in the first three matches.

On 13 April 2006, Pizzi became the coach of Club Deportivo Universidad de San Martín de Porres in the Peruvian Primera División. He returned to his country of birth five years later, working with Rosario Central and San Lorenzo de Almagro and winning the 2013 Inicial with the latter.

On 26 December 2013, Pizzi returned to Valencia after 20 years, being appointed manager. His first game in charge was on 4 January of the following year, a 2–0 derby home win over Levante UD.

Pizzi was sacked on 2 July 2014, after new owner Peter Lim took over. It was the first time in 16 years that Valencia had failed to qualify for Europe, after an eighth-place finish.

On 29 January 2016, after one year at the helm of Club León in the Liga MX, Pizzi replaced Jorge Sampaoli at the Chile national side. He took the nation to victory in the Copa América Centenario in the United States, notably disposing of Mexico 7–0 in the last-eight stage and defeating Argentina on penalties in the decisive match.

Pizzi took the team to the final of the 2017 FIFA Confederations Cup, Chile's first ever final in a FIFA competition and the fifth South American country to do so, losing 0–1 to Germany. However, after failing to qualify for the next year's World Cup – they reached the last matchday in third place, falling to sixth following the 3–0 away loss against Brazil – he resigned.

On 28 November 2017, Pizzi was appointed to manage Saudi Arabia, becoming the third man to hold the position in as many months. The team's run at the 2018 World Cup ended after the first three games (one win and two losses); On 21 January 2019, after round-of-16 elimination at the AFC Asian Cup and not having been approached by the Saudi Arabian Football Federation regarding the renewal of his contract, he resigned.

Pizzi returned to San Lorenzo in June 2019, six years after his first managerial spell. On 31 October, he was dismissed due to poor results.

On 21 January 2021, Pizzi was appointed at Racing Club de Avellaneda. His team lost the Supercopa Argentina 5–0 to River in March and the Copa de la Superliga final to Colón. He was removed by club president Víctor Blanco on 9 August after a 1–0 defeat to city rivals Club Atlético Independiente.

On 29 June 2022, Pizzi signed a one-year contract at Al-Wasl F.C. of the UAE Pro League.

Career statistics
Scores and results list Spain's goal tally first, score column indicates score after each Pizzi goal.

Managerial statistics

Honours

Player

Barcelona
La Liga: 1997–98
Copa del Rey: 1996–97, 1997–98
Supercopa de España: 1996
UEFA Cup Winners' Cup: 1996–97
UEFA Super Cup: 1997

Porto
Taça de Portugal: 2000–01

Individual
Pichichi Trophy: 1995–96

Manager
Universidad Católica
Chilean Primera División: 2010

San Lorenzo
Argentine Primera División: 2013 Inicial

Chile
Copa América: 2016

Individual
La Liga Manager of the Month: February 2014

See also
List of Spain international footballers born outside Spain

References

External links

1968 births
Living people
Argentine people of Italian descent
Spanish people of Italian descent
Argentine emigrants to Spain
Naturalised citizens of Spain
Sportspeople of Italian descent
Argentine footballers
Spanish footballers
Footballers from Santa Fe, Argentina
Association football forwards
Argentine Primera División players
Rosario Central footballers
Club Atlético River Plate footballers
Liga MX players
Deportivo Toluca F.C. players
La Liga players
CD Tenerife players
Valencia CF players
FC Barcelona players
Villarreal CF players
Primeira Liga players
FC Porto players
Spain international footballers
UEFA Euro 1996 players
1998 FIFA World Cup players
Argentine expatriate footballers
Expatriate footballers in Mexico
Expatriate footballers in Spain
Expatriate footballers in Portugal
Pichichi Trophy winners
Argentine football managers
Spanish football managers
Argentine Primera División managers
Club Atlético Colón managers
Rosario Central managers
San Lorenzo de Almagro managers
Racing Club de Avellaneda managers
Peruvian Primera División managers
Universidad San Martín managers
Chilean Primera División managers
Santiago Morning managers
Club Deportivo Universidad Católica managers
La Liga managers
Valencia CF managers
Liga MX managers
Club León managers
UAE Pro League managers
Al-Wasl F.C. managers
Chile national football team managers
Saudi Arabia national football team managers
Copa América Centenario managers
2017 FIFA Confederations Cup managers
2018 FIFA World Cup managers
2019 AFC Asian Cup managers
Argentine expatriate football managers
Spanish expatriate football managers
Expatriate football managers in Chile
Expatriate football managers in Peru
Expatriate football managers in Spain
Expatriate football managers in Mexico
Expatriate football managers in Saudi Arabia
Expatriate football managers in the United Arab Emirates
Argentine expatriate sportspeople in Spain
Argentine expatriate sportspeople in Chile
Argentine expatriate sportspeople in Peru
Argentine expatriate sportspeople in Mexico
Argentine expatriate sportspeople in Portugal
Argentine expatriate sportspeople in Saudi Arabia
Argentine expatriate sportspeople in the United Arab Emirates
Spanish expatriate sportspeople in Chile
Spanish expatriate sportspeople in Peru
Spanish expatriate sportspeople in Mexico
Spanish expatriate sportspeople in Saudi Arabia
Spanish expatriate sportspeople in the United Arab Emirates
Naturalised association football players